Roger Fry was a painter and critic.

Roger Fry may also refer to:

Roger Fry (educationist)
Roger Fry (footballer)

See also 

 Roger Fry: A Biography